Cuylerville is a hamlet in the Town of Leicester, in Livingston County, New York, United States. The population was 297 at the 2010 census, which lists the community as a census-designated place.

History
The community was named for W. T. Cuyler, an early settler. The hamlet is located on the site of Little Beard's Town, a large Seneca village destroyed in the Sullivan Campaign. Mary Jemison, known as "the White Woman of the Genesee", lived here. The National Hotel was added to the National Register of Historic Places in 2004. Located near Cuylerville is the Boyd & Parker Park and Groveland Ambuscade, listed on the National Register of Historic Places in 2009.

Geography
Cuylerville is in western Livingston County, in the eastern part of the town of Leicester. U.S. Route 20A and New York State Route 39 pass through the community together as Cuylerville Road, leading west  to Leicester village and east  to Geneseo, the Livingston county seat.

The hamlet sits at the western edge of the valley of the Genesee River.

Demographics

References

External links 

 Town of Leicester

Hamlets in New York (state)
Census-designated places in New York (state)
Census-designated places in Livingston County, New York
Hamlets in Livingston County, New York